Salvador de Arizón y Sánchez-Fano was a Spanish Lieutenant General who participated in the Cuban War of Independence and the Philippine Revolution. He was a member of the House of Arizón as well as the Directorate-General of the Civil Guard from June 26, 1917, to December 6, 1918.

Third Carlist War and Cuban War of Independence
Salvador was born on July 2, 1853, at Barcelona as the son of Don Salvador Arizón y Castro who was a major Spanish General during the First Carlist War and the Dominican Restoration War and Carmen Sánchez-Fano y Prados. After his father was killed at Puerto Plata, Arizón was appointed minor cavalry lieutenant by the royal order of Isabella II in remembrance of his father. He began serving at garrrison duty in 1871 before being transferred to the Army of the North. During the Third Carlist War, he fought at the Battle of Montejurra, the Siege of Pamplona and captured Estella-Lizarra from the Carlist forces. After the war, he received the Red Cross of Military Merit as well as two promotions. After spending some time with the Lanceros de Farnesio and Húsares de la Princesa Regiments in 1886, he was promoted to Commander in 1888 and was the aide-de-camp to General Sabas Marín at Cuba. After returning to Spain in 1893 and promoted to lieutenant colonel, he returned to Cuba to participate at the Cuban War of Independence which left him wounded but earned him a promotion to Colonel of the Cavalry in 1895 and appointed military commander of Cienfuegos. In 1894, he married Juana Mejía Castaño and they later had 8 children.

Philippine Revolution and Later Years
He later participated in the Philippine Revolution to crush the rebellion and initially did well until he was infected with a disease and had to return to Spain for medical treatment. After the war, he was given command of other brigades and appointed military commander of Cádiz and Guipúzcoa. He was promoted to Divisional General in 1906 and given command of the 4th Division as well as being appointed military governor of Granada. After being promoted to Lieutenant General in 1912, he was the Captain General of the VIII Military Region at Galicia, the Directorate-General of the Cavalry in 1915 and the Directorate-General of the Civil Guard from June 26, 1917, to December 6, 1918. The last office he would be given was commander of the II Military Region of Andalusia from 1918 until his death on March 1, 1921.

Awards
Red Cross of Military Merit, 1st Class
White Cross of Military Merit, 1st Class
, 2nd Class
Royal and Military Order of Saint Hermenegild, Grand Cross
Military Order of Maria Cristina, Grand Cross
Order of Charles III

Foreign Awards
 Cambodia: Imperial Order of the Dragon of Annam, Grand Cross

References

1853 births
1921 deaths
People from Barcelona
Spanish lieutenant generals
Spanish military personnel of the Third Carlist War (Governmental faction)
Spanish military personnel of the Spanish–American War
Spanish military personnel of the Second Melillan campaign
Spanish military personnel of the Kert campaign
Crosses of Military Merit
Grand Crosses of the Royal and Military Order of San Hermenegild